Melanoxanthus is a genus of click beetles.

List of species
 Melanoxanthus abdominalis Candèze, 1893
 Melanoxanthus abyssinus Candèze, 1865
 Melanoxanthus acutifrons Fleutiaux, 1934
 Melanoxanthus adamsoni (Van Zwaluwenburg, 1932)
 Melanoxanthus affinis Fleutiaux, 1914
 Melanoxanthus agranulosus Vats & Chauhan, 1992
 Melanoxanthus alluaudi Fleutiaux, 1933
 Melanoxanthus almaca Wurst, Schimmel & Platia, 2001
 Melanoxanthus ambiguus Schwarz, 1900
 Melanoxanthus angularis Candèze, 1878
 Melanoxanthus anticus Candèze, 1892
 Melanoxanthus approximatus Candèze, 1875
 Melanoxanthus archeducalis Heller, 1900
 Melanoxanthus arcuatus Van Zwaluwenburg, 1957
 Melanoxanthus ardjoenicus Candèze, 1882
 Melanoxanthus argus Van Zwaluwenburg, 1957
 Melanoxanthus ater Fleutiaux, 1914
 Melanoxanthus atripennis (W.J. Macleay, 1872)
 Melanoxanthus aurantiacus Candèze, 1893
 Melanoxanthus basalis Fleutiaux, 1934
 Melanoxanthus bella (Van Zwaluwenburg, 1932)
 Melanoxanthus bellulus Van Zwaluwenburg, 1948
 Melanoxanthus biarctus Carter, 1939
 Melanoxanthus bicinctus Fleutiaux, 1916
 Melanoxanthus bicolor Candèze, 1893
 Melanoxanthus bifasciatus Candèze, 1865
 Melanoxanthus biligatus Candèze, 1900
 Melanoxanthus bilineatus Fleutiaux, 1934
 Melanoxanthus bilunatus Candèze, 1865
 Melanoxanthus bimaculatus Fleutiaux, 1918
 Melanoxanthus binus Candèze, 1889
 Melanoxanthus bipartitus Candèze, 1875
 Melanoxanthus biplagiatus Candeze
 Melanoxanthus bistellatus Candèze, 1893
 Melanoxanthus bitriplex Candèze, 1897
 Melanoxanthus brevicornis Fleutiaux
 Melanoxanthus butuanus Fleutiaux, 1916
 Melanoxanthus caledonicus (Fleutiaux, 1891)
 Melanoxanthus carinulatus Schwarz, 1902
 Melanoxanthus cinnamomeus Candèze, 1893
 Melanoxanthus circumcinctus Candèze, 1900
 Melanoxanthus columbinus Carter, 1939
 Melanoxanthus comes Candèze, 1897
 Melanoxanthus comosus Candèze, 1889
 Melanoxanthus comptus (Van Zwaluwenburg, 1928)
 Melanoxanthus confusus Candèze, 1880
 Melanoxanthus consimilis Fleutiaux, 1935
 Melanoxanthus contracta (Van Zwaluwenburg, 1932)
 Melanoxanthus convexa (Van Zwaluwenburg, 1932)
 Melanoxanthus cracens Van Zwaluwenburg, 1957
 Melanoxanthus crucifer Fleutiaux, 1914
 Melanoxanthus cuneatus Candèze, 1865
 Melanoxanthus cuneiformis Candèze, 1882
 Melanoxanthus cuneolus (Schwarz, 1902)
 Melanoxanthus cylindricus Candèze, 1880
 Melanoxanthus cylindriformis Candèze
 Melanoxanthus decemguttatus Candèze, 1875
 Melanoxanthus decemmaculatus Candèze, 1883
 Melanoxanthus decemnotatus Candèze, 1878
 Melanoxanthus decimus Candèze, 1878
 Melanoxanthus dilaticollis Candèze, 1882
 Melanoxanthus dimidiatus Candèze, 1878
 Melanoxanthus discicollis Schwarz
 Melanoxanthus discoidalis Schwarz, 1902
 Melanoxanthus dissitus Van Zwaluwenburg, 1957
 Melanoxanthus divergens Van Zwaluwenburg, 1957
 Melanoxanthus dohrni Schwarz, 1902
 Melanoxanthus dolosus Candèze, 1865
 Melanoxanthus doriae Candèze, 1878
 Melanoxanthus ducalis Candèze, 1882
 Melanoxanthus elongatus Fleutiaux, 1895
 Melanoxanthus epitrotus Candèze, 1865
 Melanoxanthus exclamationis Candèze, 1875
 Melanoxanthus exiguus Van Zwaluwenburg, 1931
 Melanoxanthus eximius Schwarz, 1902
 Melanoxanthus exitiosus Candèze, 1897
 Melanoxanthus fasciata (Van Zwaluwenburg, 1932)
 Melanoxanthus ferrugineus Candèze, 1891
 Melanoxanthus festivus Van Zwaluwenburg, 1957
 Melanoxanthus festucalis Candèze, 1900
 Melanoxanthus filiformis Candèze, 1882
 Melanoxanthus finitimus Fleutiaux, 1932
 Melanoxanthus flavangularis Schwarz, 1906
 Melanoxanthus flavangulus Candèze, 1865
 Melanoxanthus flavidus (Candèze, 1878)
 Melanoxanthus flavipes Fleutiaux, 1928
 Melanoxanthus flavithorax Schimmel, 2004
 Melanoxanthus flavobasalis Schwarz
 Melanoxanthus flavocinctus Candèze, 1900
 Melanoxanthus flavosignatus Carter, 1939
 Melanoxanthus fleutiauxi Fairmaire, 1901
 Melanoxanthus florensis Candèze, 1882
 Melanoxanthus fractus Candèze, 1878
 Melanoxanthus francoisi Fleutiaux, 1938
 Melanoxanthus frictus Candèze, 1894
 Melanoxanthus frivolus Candèze, 1900
 Melanoxanthus froggatti (W.J. Macleay, 1888)
 Melanoxanthus fumosus Schwarz, 1900
 Melanoxanthus fusiformis Fleutiaux
 Melanoxanthus fusus Candèze, 1897
 Melanoxanthus futilis (Candèze, 1887)
 Melanoxanthus geminatus Schwarz, 1902
 Melanoxanthus geminus Candèze, 1894
 Melanoxanthus glyphonides Van Zwaluwenburg, 1931
 Melanoxanthus gourvesi Chassain, 2001
 Melanoxanthus gracilis Candèze, 1900
 Melanoxanthus grandis (Van Zwaluwenburg, 1932)
 Melanoxanthus grandis Fleutiaux, 1934
 Melanoxanthus granum Candèze, 1887
 Melanoxanthus guamensis Van Zwaluwenburg, 1942
 Melanoxanthus guttatus Candeze
 Melanoxanthus guttulatus Candèze, 1865
 Melanoxanthus haddeni Fleutiaux, 1932
 Melanoxanthus hebridanus Fleutiaux, 1938
 Melanoxanthus hemionus Candèze, 1893
 Melanoxanthus hermosa (Van Zwaluwenburg, 1943)
 Melanoxanthus illustris Fleutiaux, 1921
 Melanoxanthus imitator Candèze, 1893
 Melanoxanthus inaequalis Candeze
 Melanoxanthus infuscatus Fleutiaux, 1916
 Melanoxanthus ingridae Schimmel, 2004
 Melanoxanthus insignus Fleutiaux, 1921
 Melanoxanthus insolitus Carter, 1939
 Melanoxanthus insularis (Van Zwaluwenburg, 1932)
 Melanoxanthus insularis Fleutiaux, 1922
 Melanoxanthus jucundus Carter, 1939
 Melanoxanthus lamottei Girard, 1971
 Melanoxanthus lansbergei Candèze, 1882
 Melanoxanthus lariversi Van Zwaluwenburg, 1957
 Melanoxanthus latemaculatus Fleutiaux, 1928
 Melanoxanthus lateplagiatus Fairmaire
 Melanoxanthus lateralis Fleutiaux, 1932
 Melanoxanthus lativittis Carter, 1939
 Melanoxanthus lepidus Van Zwaluwenburg, 1957
 Melanoxanthus litura Candèze, 1865
 Melanoxanthus luteicollis Fleutiaux, 1928
 Melanoxanthus luzonicus Fleutiaux, 1914
 Melanoxanthus maculicollis Fleutiaux, 1933
 Melanoxanthus madagascariensis Fleutiaux, 1932
 Melanoxanthus major Candèze, 1900
 Melanoxanthus melanocephalus (Fabricius, 1781)
 Melanoxanthus melanurus Candèze, 1878
 Melanoxanthus minor Van Zwaluwenburg, 1957
 Melanoxanthus minutus Candèze, 1897
 Melanoxanthus mirabilis (Fleutiaux, 1928)
 Melanoxanthus mocquerysi Fleutiaux, 1933
 Melanoxanthus montana (Van Zwaluwenburg, 1932)
 Melanoxanthus mumfordi (Van Zwaluwenburg, 1932)
 Melanoxanthus nana (Van Zwaluwenburg, 1932)
 Melanoxanthus niger Schwarz, 1901
 Melanoxanthus nigricornis Candèze
 Melanoxanthus nigripennis Fleutiaux, 1928
 Melanoxanthus nigriventris Candèze, 1889
 Melanoxanthus nigrosignatus Candèze, 1890
 Melanoxanthus nitidicollis Fleutiaux, 1916
 Melanoxanthus obscura (Van Zwaluwenburg, 1932)
 Melanoxanthus ornatus Fleutiaux, 1934
 Melanoxanthus pachyderoides Schwarz, 1902
 Melanoxanthus paeninsularis Chassain, 2001
 Melanoxanthus palawanensis Ôhira, 1974
 Melanoxanthus palliatus Candèze, 1892
 Melanoxanthus partitus Candèze, 1878
 Melanoxanthus parvulus Fleutiaux, 1934
 Melanoxanthus petersoni Ôhira, 1974
 Melanoxanthus plagiellus Schwarz, 1902
 Melanoxanthus princeps Candèze, 1900
 Melanoxanthus promecus Candèze, 1865
 Melanoxanthus proximus Candèze, 1878
 Melanoxanthus puerulus Candèze, 1898
 Melanoxanthus pusillus Candèze, 1865
 Melanoxanthus quadrilineatus Schwarz, 1902
 Melanoxanthus quadrillum Candèze, 1865
 Melanoxanthus quadrinotatus Candèze, 1865
 Melanoxanthus quadripunctatus Candèze, 1859
 Melanoxanthus quadrivittatus Candèze, 1897
 Melanoxanthus quintus Candèze, 1894
 Melanoxanthus ramusculus Candèze, 1865
 Melanoxanthus recreatus Candèze, 1897
 Melanoxanthus remota (Van Zwaluwenburg, 1932)
 Melanoxanthus rhomboidalis Candèze, 1875
 Melanoxanthus rimosus (Boheman, 1858)
 Melanoxanthus rotundicollis (Fleutiaux, 1891)
 Melanoxanthus ruficollis Candèze, 1878
 Melanoxanthus rufinus Candèze, 1865
 Melanoxanthus rufoniger Carter, 1939
 Melanoxanthus rufotactus Candèze, 1878
 Melanoxanthus ruptus Candèze, 1883
 Melanoxanthus sannio Van Zwaluwenburg, 1957
 Melanoxanthus schawalleri Schimmel, 2004
 Melanoxanthus schwarzi Schenkling, 1925
 Melanoxanthus semiruber Carter, 1939
 Melanoxanthus semitinctus (Boheman, 1859)
 Melanoxanthus senegalensis Candeze
 Melanoxanthus sexguttatus Candèze, 1892
 Melanoxanthus sextus Candèze, 1875
 Melanoxanthus sicardi Fleutiaux, 1933
 Melanoxanthus silus Van Zwaluwenburg, 1957
 Melanoxanthus silvestris (Van Zwaluwenburg, 1932)
 Melanoxanthus similatus Schwarz, 1902
 Melanoxanthus similis Van Zwaluwenburg, 1957
 Melanoxanthus simplex Van Zwaluwenburg, 1957
 Melanoxanthus sonani Miwa, 1934
 Melanoxanthus subcylindricus Candèze, 1865
 Melanoxanthus subhumeralis Schwarz, 1902
 Melanoxanthus suturalis Schwarz
 Melanoxanthus taeniatus Candèze, 1878
 Melanoxanthus terminatus Candèze, 1875
 Melanoxanthus tetraspilotus Fairmaire, 1883
 Melanoxanthus tricolor Candèze, 1893
 Melanoxanthus tulagi Van Zwaluwenburg, 1934
 Melanoxanthus uncinatus Candèze, 1897
 Melanoxanthus unicolor Candèze, 1897
 Melanoxanthus unipunctatus Candèze, 1894
 Melanoxanthus usingeri Van Zwaluwenburg, 1942
 Melanoxanthus ustulatus Schwarz
 Melanoxanthus varians Van Zwaluwenburg, 1957
 Melanoxanthus venustus Van Zwaluwenburg, 1957
 Melanoxanthus vicinus Fleutiaux, 1916
 Melanoxanthus vitiensis (Van Zwaluwenburg, 1932)
 Melanoxanthus vittatus Candèze, 1865
 Melanoxanthus vittipennis Schwarz, 1901
 Melanoxanthus wenzelorum Schimmel, 2004
 Melanoxanthus xanthographus Motschulsky, 1859
 Melanoxanthus yushiroi W. Suzuki, 1999

References 

 Synopsis of the described coleoptera of the world

Elateridae genera